Huangheya is a town in Decheng District, Dezhou, in northwestern Shandong province, China. , it administers the following 29 villages: 
Huangheya Village
Lüyuan Village
Xinjizhuang Village
Gengliyang Village
Zhabei Village
Wangchengzhai Village
Qianhouli Village
Dashi Village
Dongxitun Village
Xinqiu Village
Taoyuan Village
Dayuzhuang Village
Wangcundian Village
Xinyuan Village
Lijiaqiao Village
Sanshilipu Village
Jiahe Village
Lezhang Village
Nianlipu Village
Sixin Village
Zhangweixin Village
Lijiamiao Village
Shayang Village
Jiu Village
Jiaozhuang Village
Wanglü Village
Songqitun Village
Xuzhuang Village
Tengzhuang Village

References

Township-level divisions of Shandong
Dezhou